Conway Residential Historic District is a national historic district located at Conway in Horry County, South Carolina. It encompasses 125 contributing buildings and one contributing object.   It includes a variety of quality 19th and 20th-century residential buildings, until about 1955. The residential buildings reflect a variety of popular architectural styles including Greek Revival, Carpenter Gothic Revival, Queen Anne, Italianate, and Tudor and Colonial Revival. The District also contains four apartment buildings, one school, a church, and a Confederate monument.  Four properties in this historic district were previously listed: the Beaty-Little House, the Burroughs School, the J.W. Holliday Jr. House, and the W. H. Winborne House.

It was listed on the National Register of Historic Places in 2010.

References

External links
Conway Residential Historic District Map

Houses on the National Register of Historic Places in South Carolina
Historic districts on the National Register of Historic Places in South Carolina
Houses in Horry County, South Carolina
National Register of Historic Places in Horry County, South Carolina
Buildings and structures in Conway, South Carolina